Xylopia ekmanii is a species of plant in the Annonaceae family. It is endemic to Cuba.

References

ekmanii
Endemic flora of Cuba
Taxonomy articles created by Polbot